Harry Potter and the Order of the Phoenix is a fantasy novel written by British author J. K. Rowling and the fifth novel in the Harry Potter series. It follows Harry Potter's struggles through his fifth year at Hogwarts School of Witchcraft and Wizardry, including the surreptitious return of the antagonist Lord Voldemort, O.W.L. exams, and an obstructive Ministry of Magic. The novel was published on 21 June 2003 by Bloomsbury in the United Kingdom, Scholastic in the United States, and Raincoast in Canada. It sold five million copies in the first 24 hours of publication.

Harry Potter and the Order of the Phoenix won several awards, including the American Library Association Best Book Award for Young Adults in 2003. The book was also made into a 2007 film, and a video game by Electronic Arts.

Plot
During the summer, Harry Potter is left frustrated by his lack of involvement in Dumbledore's efforts to combat a newly-resurgent Lord Voldemort. One evening, he is attacked by Dementors, causing a group of wizards belonging to the Order of the Phoenix, to evacuate him from the Dursley residence. They whisk him off to Number 12, Grimmauld Place, Sirius Black's childhood home, which is now headquarters for the Order. Harry learns from Ron and Hermione that the Order is a secret organisation created by Dumbledore dedicated to fighting Voldemort and the Death Eaters. Harry wants to join, but Ron's mother, Molly disapproves. 

Harry is the target of a Ministry-led smear campaign, under Cornelius Fudge, to malign him for stating that Voldemort has returned. Dolores Umbridge, a senior Ministry employee, becomes the new Defence Against the Dark Arts teacher at Hogwarts. She initiates strict rules and a textbook-only approach, forbidding practice of defensive spells by students. This leads Harry, Ron, and Hermione to form their own Defence group with other students called Dumbledore's Army, who secretly meet in the Room of Requirement to practise under Harry's instruction.

One night, Harry has a vision of Arthur Weasley being attacked by Voldemort's snake, Nagini, which turns out to be true. Arthur is rescued, but Dumbledore realises that Harry's and Voldemort's minds are connected. He arranges for Professor Snape to teach Harry Occlumency, a skill where one closes their mind against others. Umbridge is tipped-off about Dumbledore's Army; to prevent Harry's expulsion for forming a secret organization, Dumbledore takes responsibility for the group, then goes into hiding to evade arrest. Umbridge is appointed headmistress.

Harry's Occlumency lessons go poorly. During exams, he has a vision of Sirius being tortured by Voldemort in the Department of Mysteries at the Ministry. While trying to contact Sirius at Grimmauld Place, Harry is caught by Umbridge using her office's Floo Network. She questions Harry and threatens to use the Cruciatus Curse on him. Hermione intervenes, and concocts a story that leads them into the Forbidden Forest. Umbridge provokes the centaurs there and they take her captive. 

Harry, Ron, Hermione, Ginny, Neville and Luna, fly to the Ministry to save Sirius, but he is not to be found inside the Department of Mysteries. Instead, the room is filled with shelves of glass spheres, one of which bears Harry's name along with Voldemort. Harry picks it up, and is immediately surrounded by Death Eaters. Lucius Malfoy reveals that Harry was tricked there by a fake vision from Voldemort, and that he wishes to hear the prophecy contained in the glass sphere. He asks Harry for the sphere, but Harry refuses. The Hogwarts group fight against the Death Eaters and evade them, aided by the arrival of the Order members. Neville accidentally drops and breaks the prophecy, and Sirius ends up dying at the hands of Bellatrix Lestrange. 

Harry chases after Bellatrix. Voldemort arrives and tries to kill Harry, but is thwarted by Dumbledore. Ministry of Magic employees arrive; they spot Voldemort just before he escapes with Bellatrix, and Fudge is forced to accept his return. In his office, Dumbledore explains to Harry that the prophecy was made by Professor Trelawney, and predicted the birth of a child with power against Voldemort. This had caused Voldemort to pursue Harry's parents, and is the reason he continues to target Harry. Overwhelmed by the prophecy and mourning the loss of Sirius, Harry grows sullen, although the wizarding community now affords him great respect. Motivated by his friends, Harry returns to the Dursleys.

Publication and release
Potter fans waited three years between the releases of the fourth and fifth books. Before the release of the fifth book, 200 million copies of the first four books had already been sold and translated into 55 languages in 200 countries. As the series was already a global phenomenon, the book forged new pre-order records, with thousands of people queuing outside book stores on 20 June 2003 to secure copies at midnight. Despite the security, thousands of copies were stolen from an Earlestown, Merseyside warehouse on 15 June 2003.

Critical response

Harry Potter and the Order of the Phoenix was met with mostly positive reviews and received several awards. In 2004, the book was cited as an American Library Association Best Book for Young Adults and as an American Library Association Notable Book. It also received the Oppenheim Toy Portfolio 2004 Gold Medal, along with several other awards. Rowling was praised for her imagination by USA Today writer Deirdre Donahue. 
The New York Times writer John Leonard praised the novel, saying "The Order of the Phoenix starts slow, gathers speed and then skateboards, with somersaults, to its furious conclusion....As Harry gets older, Rowling gets better." However, he also criticised "the one-note Draco Malfoy" and the predictable Lord Voldemort.

Most negative reviewers were concerned with the violence contained in the novel and with Christian morality occurring throughout the book.

Predecessors and sequels
Harry Potter and the Order of the Phoenix is the fifth book in the Harry Potter series. The first book in the series, Harry Potter and the Philosopher's Stone, was first published by Bloomsbury in 1997 with an initial print-run of 500 copies in hardback, 300 of which were distributed to libraries. By the end of 1997, the UK edition won a National Book Award and a gold medal in the 9-to-11-year-olds category of the Nestlé Smarties Book Prize. The second novel, Harry Potter and the Chamber of Secrets, was published in the UK on 2 July 1998. The third novel, Harry Potter and the Prisoner of Azkaban, was published a year later in the UK on 8 July 1999 and in the US on 8 September 1999. The fourth novel, Harry Potter and the Goblet of Fire, was published 8 July 2000, simultaneously by Bloomsbury and Scholastic. The fifth novel, Harry Potter and the Order of the Phoenix, is the longest book in the series, yet it is the second-shortest film at 2 hours 18 minutes.

After the publishing of Order of the Phoenix, the sixth book of the series, Harry Potter and the Half-Blood Prince, was published on 16 July 2005 and sold 9 million copies in the first 24 hours of its worldwide release. The seventh and final novel, Harry Potter and the Deathly Hallows, was published 21 July 2007. The book sold 11 million copies within 24 hours of its release: 2.7 million copies in the UK and 8.3 million in the US.

Adaptations

Film

In 2007, Harry Potter and the Order of the Phoenix was released in a film version directed by David Yates and written by Michael Goldenberg. The film was produced by David Heyman's company, Heyday Films, alongside David Barron. The budget was reportedly between £75 and 100 million (US$150–200 million), and it became the unadjusted eleventh-highest-grossing film of all time and a critical and commercial success. The film opened to a worldwide 5-day opening of $333 million, the third best of all time, and grossed $940 million total, second to Pirates of the Caribbean: At World's End for the greatest total of 2007.

Video games

A video game adaptation of the book and film versions of Harry Potter and the Order of the Phoenix was made for Microsoft Windows, PS2, PS3, Xbox 360, PSP, Nintendo DS, Wii, Game Boy Advance, and Mac OS X. It was released on 25 June 2007 in the U.S., 28 June 2007 in Australia, and 29 June 2007 in the UK and Europe for PlayStation 3, PSP, PlayStation 2, Windows, and 3 July 2007 for most other platforms. The games were published by Electronic Arts.

The book is also depicted in the 2011 video game Lego Harry Potter: Years 5–7.

Translations

The first official foreign translation of the book appeared in Vietnamese on 21 July 2003, when the first of twenty-two instalments was released. The first official European translation appeared in Serbia and Montenegro in Serbian by the official publisher Narodna Knjiga in early September 2003. Other translations appeared later (e.g. in November 2003 in Dutch and German). The English-language version has topped the bestseller list in France, whereas in Germany and the Netherlands, an unofficial distributed translation process was started on the internet.

See also

 Religious debates over the Harry Potter series

References

External links

Common Sense Media Age Rating

2003 British novels
2003 children's books
2003 fantasy novels
Anthony Award-winning works
BILBY Award-winning works
Bloomsbury Publishing books
Bram Stoker Award for Best Work for Young Readers winners
British novels adapted into films
Fiction set in 1995
Fiction set in 1996
05
Novels about spirit possession
Novels about totalitarianism
Fiction about rebellions
Scholastic Corporation books
Sequel novels
Children's fantasy novels